Naberezhny is a rural locality (a village) in Savaleyevsky Selsoviet, Karmaskalinsky District, Bashkortostan, Russia. The population was 6 as of 2010. There is 1 street.

Geography 
Naberezhny is located 86 km northeast of Karmaskaly (the district's administrative centre) by road. Okhlebinino is the nearest rural locality.

References 

Rural localities in Karmaskalinsky District